The list of shipwrecks in 1932 includes ships sunk, foundered, grounded, or otherwise lost during 1932.

January

1 January

2 January

4 January

5 January

6 January

7 January

8 January

10 January

11 January

12 January

14 January

15 January

19 January

20 January

21 January

22 January

23 January

26 January

27 January

28 January

29 January

30 January

February

3 February

4 February

5 February

6 February

8 February

10 February

11 February

12 February

14 February

15 February

16 February

18 February

20 February

21 February

22 February

23 February

24 February

27 February

28 February

29 February

March

1 March

2 March

4 March

5 March

6 March

7 March

8 March

9 March

12 March

13 March

14 March

16 March

22 March

24 March

25 March

27 March

29 March

30 March

April

1 April

2 April

3 April

6 April

7 April

9 April

10 April

11 April

12 April

13 April

16 April

19 April

20 April

26 April

27 April

28 April

29 April

30 April

May

1 May

2 May

4 May

5 May

7 May

8 May

11 May

12 May

14 May

15 May

16 May

19 May

21 May

22 May

23 May

25 May

26 May

27 May

June

1 June

2 June

7 June

8 June

9 June

10 June

13 June

14 June

15 June

17 June

23 June

25 June

27 June

29 June

July

1 July

2 July

6 July

7 July

8 July

10 July

11 July

13 July

15 July

16 July

17 July

20 July

21 July

22 July

23 July

25 July

26 July

29 July

August

3 August

4 August

5 August

6 August

7 August

8 August

9 August

12 August

13 August

16 August

18 August

20 August

22 August

30 August

31 August

Unknown date

September

1 September

2 September

3 September

6 September

7 September

9 September

10 September

11 September

12 September

13 September

14 September

17 September

21 September

23 September

25 September

26 September

27 September

30 September

October

1 October

2 October

4 October

5 October

6 October

8 October

9 October

10 October

11 October

13 October

14 October

15 October

17 October

18 October

24 October

25 October

28 October

29 October

31 October

November

2 November

3 November

5 November

6 November

7 November

8 November

10 November

11 November

12 November

13 November

14 November

18 November

19 November

22 November

23 November

26 November

27 November

28 November

29 November

30 November

December

1 December

2 December

4 December

5 December

7 December

8 December

9 December

10 December

11 December

12 December

13 December

14 December

15 December

16 December

17 December

19 December

21 December

22 December

23 December

24 December

25 December

27 December

28 December

29 December

Unknown date

Unknown date

References

1932
Shipwrecks